List of computer-related books which have articles on Wikipedia for themselves or their writers.

Programming
Bjarne Stroustrup - The C++ Programming Language
Brian W. Kernighan, Rob Pike - The Practice of Programming
Donald Knuth - The Art of Computer Programming
Ellen Ullman - Close to the Machine
Ellis Horowitz - Fundamentals of Computer Algorithms
Eric Raymond - The Art of Unix Programming
Gerald M. Weinberg - The Psychology of Computer Programming
James Gosling - The Java Programming Language
Joel Spolsky - The Best Software Writing I
Keith Curtis - After the Software Wars
Richard M. Stallman - Free Software, Free Society
Richard P. Gabriel - Patterns of Software
Richard P. Gabriel - Innovation Happens Elsewhere

Hackers and hacker culture
Steven Levy - Hackers: Heroes of the Computer Revolution
Douglas Thomas - Hacker Culture
Open Sources: Voices from the Open Source Revolution
Suelette Dreyfus - Underground: Hacking, Madness and Obsession on the Electronic Frontier
Eric S. Raymond - The New Hacker's Dictionary
Sam Williams - Free as in Freedom
Bruce Sterling - The Hacker Crackdown
Kevin Mitnick - Ghost in the Wires
Malcolm Nance - The Plot to Hack America

Internet
Jack Goldsmith, Tim Wu - Who Controls the Internet? Illusions of Borderless World
Douglas Rushkoff - Cyberia: Life in the Trenches of Hyperspace

 
Books
Computer
Computer books
Books about computer hacking